Mohsen Ghaedpouri (born September 21, 1982) is an Iranian footballer who plays for Iranjavan F.C. in the IPL.

Club career
Ghaedpouri joined Iranjavan F.C. in 2009 after spending the previous season at Bargh Shiraz F.C.

References

1982 births
Living people
Iranjavan players
Bargh Shiraz players
Gol Gohar players
Iranian footballers
Association football midfielders